The Saltigue (other spelling: Saltigué, Saltigui or Saltigi in Serer), are Serer high priests and priestesses who preside over the religious ceremonies and affairs of the Serer people, such as the Xooy (or Xoy) ceremony, the biggest event in the Serer religious calendar.  They usually come from ancient Serer paternal families.  Such a title is usually inherited by birthright. In Serer country, Saltigue are always diviners. The scope of this article deals only with the Serer Saltigues – "diviners" (the high priests and priestesses) and termed by some scholars as "the ministers of the religious cult"; "pastors of the people" or within the remits of these definitions.

Etymology
In Serer, saltigue derives from two words: "sal" and "tigui"; sal means "meeting point of two ways. Place where one branch branches into two other branches. And by analogy, beam on which the roof of the hut rests." Tigui means "resting the roof of the hut." Tigui: really means (1). The combination of these two terms gave its name to "saltigue."

Role of Saltigues
The Saltigues were advisers to Serer governments, for example in the old Serer Kingdoms of Sine, Saloum and Baol. Their principal role was and still is for the prosperity of the country. In this role, they were responsible for predicting the future of kings; the weather to come (for the purposes of agriculture); any natural disaster or political catastrophe that could befall the country; etc. As such, they were frequently consulted by the Serer kings (Maad a Sinig and Maad Saloum) preferably at the beginning of the rainy season.

Before a king launches a war against another kingdom, or to repel an attack from another kingdom, the king consults the great assembly of Saltigues to predict the outcome of the battle, as was the case of Saltigué and Diaraf Wassaly Sene and Saltigué Laba Diene Ngom at the Battle of Fandane-Thiouthioune (18 July 1867), commonly known as the Battle of Somb, during the reign of Maad a Sinig Kumba Ndoffene Famak Joof. The assembly of Saltigues will predict the outcome, offer precautionary advice on when to launch the attack, the route to take to the battlefield and the animals to be sacrificed, etc. The role of Saltigue was not political. They are not government ministers or politicians, but spiritual advisors and elders. They are the Serer hereditary "Rain priests" – guardians of the Serer religion and customs, a birthright they inherited from their ancient Lamanic ancestors.

In the precolonial period, during the Raan Festival which takes place in Tukar annually on the second Thursday after the onset of the new moon in April, the kings (during the Guelowar period) will attend the Raan Festival of Tukar, making their way from the capital (Diakhao). However, the king was extremely careful never to arrive before the Lamane and always avoid direct encounters with the Lamane of Tukar. Whilst the Lamane was busy self-meditating, touring Tukar and making offerings to the pangool Jegan Joof, the Chief Saltigue and his associates drink sum-sum alcohol all morning before the Festival. It is reported that drinking sum-sum improves the Saltigue's vision of the future and the supernatural world.

Having prepared himself sufficiently, the Saltigue and his close associates leave the house and mount their horses, then start their own tour of some of the sacred places of the country. The Saltigué's tour is programmed to follow the king, but ultimately to cross his path at a location known as "Nenem". In this location, the king, aware that the Saltigue is coming, stops the royal entourage. The king and the royal entourage must wait for the Saltigue and his companions to pass. After these high priests and priestesses have passed, the king then gives the signal to the royal entourage to pass as they proceed to their next destination. This is the kind of respect that is afforded to the Saltigue. Scholars like Alioune Sarr note that Saltigues are famously celebrated and respected in Serer Kingdoms because of their knowledge.

Serer and Lebu healing methods
The Lebu people share many cosmo-spiritual beliefs with the Serers. Many Lebu rab (jinn) are actually Serer pangool (ancestral spirits or saints). The sacred dwelling place of the Lebu rab is the same as the Serer pangool called Sangomar, based on the ancient Serer and Diola legend of Jambooñ and Agaire. – two young sisters whose boat split into half around the Point of Sangomar. One sails to the north, the other sails south. Those traveling south became the ancestors of the Diolas and the other became the ancestor of the Serers. The healing method of the Lebu is called ndepp while the Serer healing method is called Loup.

See also 

 Serer religion
 Roog
 Serer people
 Lebu people
 Serer prehistory
 Hogon

Notes

Religious occupations
Serer religion
African secret societies